Jewels 1st Ring, originally  was the inaugural mixed martial arts (MMA) event of the then newly created women's MMA promotion Jewels.

Background
Women's promotion Smackgirl had faced several problems prior to being bought by Marverous Japan. The new parent company decided to change the promotion's name into Jewels to have a fresh start. It was decided that the first events would have the same rules as Smackgirl and broadcast on Samurai TV in Japan.

The first four matches announced were Saori Ishioka vs. Mika Nagano, Misaki Takimoto vs. Masako Yoshida, Sachiko Yamamoto vs. Kazumi Kaneko and Harumi Harumi vs. Shizuka Sugiyama. The rest of the card was announced a few days later.

Results

See also 
 Jewels (mixed martial arts)
 2008 in Jewels

References

External links
Official results at Jewels 
Event results at Sherdog
Event results at Fightergirls.com
Event results  at Bout Review 
Event results at God Bless the Ring 
Event results at kakutoh.com 
Event results at sportsnavi.com 

Jewels (mixed martial arts) events
2008 in mixed martial arts
Mixed martial arts in Japan
Sports competitions in Tokyo
2008 in Japanese sport